Audace was the name of at least three ships of the Italian Navy and may refer to:

 , an  launched in 1913 and sunk in 1916 following a collision.
 , a destroyer ordered for Japan from Yarrow as Kawakaze transferred to Italy while building renamed Intrepido then Audace. Seized by Germany 1943, renamed TA20 and sunk in 1944.
 , an  launched in 1971 and decommissioned in 2006.

Italian Navy ship names